Vietomartyria baishanzuna is a species of moth belonging to the family Micropterigidae. It was described in 1995. It is known from Zhejiang Province, China. It was described from Mount Baishanzu.

References

Micropterigidae
Moths of Asia
Insects of China
Endemic fauna of Zhejiang
Moths described in 1995